Nevins may refer to:

Places

United States 
Nevins Township, Vigo County, Indiana
Nevins, Florida
Nevins, Illinois
Nevins, Wisconsin

Surnames
Al Nevins, American musician and founder of The Three Suns
Allan Nevins (1890–1971), American historian
Daniel S. Nevins (born 1966), Rabbi; Dean of the Rabbinical School at the Jewish Theological Seminary of America
 David Nevins, Jr. (1839–1898) - American merchant and philanthropist
Jason Nevins (born 1972), American dance music producer
Jess Nevins (born 1966), American writer
John Joseph Nevins (1932–2014), American Roman Catholic bishop
Monica Nevins (born 1973), Canadian mathematician
Sheila Nevins (born 1939), American television producer
Sylvester Nevins (died 1901), Wisconsin State senator

See also
Nevin (disambiguation)
Nevinson